Indrani is an Indian Bengali television series broadcast on Colors Bangla and digital platform Voot. Produced by Shashi Mittal and Sumeet Mittal under the banner of Shashi Sumeet Productions. It premiered on 18 July 2022. It stars Ankita Chakraborty and Rahul Ganguly in the lead role.

Plot 

The show is based on Dr. Indrani Roy and a boy, Aditya.

Cast
 Ankita Chakraborty as Indrani Roy – Piklu and Titli's mother -dilip's aka parichad's former wife , aditya's wife
 Rahul Ganguly as Aditya Purkayastha aka Adi - Angshu's son, Shibani's son, Sanchari's stepson, a medical student - indrani's husband 
 Sambhabi as Paromita Roy aka  Titli - Indrani and Dilip's daughter
 Soma Banerjee as Dilip's mother
 Bikash Bhowmik as Dilip's father
 Sumanta Mukherjee as Mayukh Ranjan Purkayastha - Aditya's grandfather
 Deb Chatterjee as Angshuman Purkayastha aka Angshu - Aditya's father, Shibani's first husband, Sanchari's second husband
 Suchandrima as Sanchari Purkayastha - Aditya's stepmother
 Anindita Das as Swagata - Indrani's friend, a hospital employee
 Nayna Palit Bandopadhyay as Chanda Purkayastha - Angshu's sister
 Arijit Chowdhury as Dilip Roy aka Parijaat- Indrani's estranged and first husband, Piklu and Titli's estranged father
 Sukanya Basu as Mohini - a hospital staff
 Unknown as Dr. Shibani Purkayastha - Aditya's mother, Angshu's first wife (deceased)
 Sakshi Roy  as Dr.Nisha Roy
 Sangrami Rumpa as Shahana

References

Bengali-language television programming in India
2022 Indian television series debuts
Television shows set in Mumbai
Colors Bangla original programming